Madiromirafy is a town and commune in Madagascar. It belongs to the district of Maevatanana, which is a part of Betsiboka Region. The population of the commune was estimated to be approximately 4,000 in 2001 commune census.

Only primary schooling is available. The majority 90% of the population of the commune are farmers, while an additional 4% receives their livelihood from raising livestock. The most important crops are rice and peanuts, while other important agricultural products are maize and tobacco.  Additionally fishing employs 6% of the population.

References and notes 

Populated places in Betsiboka